Szymon (Symon) Samuel Sanguszko (before 1592 – November 1638) was a noble of the Polish–Lithuanian Commonwealth. He was castellan of Mścisław from 1620 and Voivode of Mińsk, later, from 1626 or 1629 voivode of Witebsk.

He was raised by the Sapieha family, including Lew Sapieha. Due to those connections he quickly gained political connections. In 1620 he becomes the marshal of Orsza and castellan of Mścisław. He took part in the Polish–Muscovite War (1605–18) where he fought near Moscow, and he fought in the Polish–Swedish War. He was an envoy to Moscow at some point.

First of the Sanguszko family to convert from Eastern Orthodox to Catholicism, he supported conversions to Catholicism among his subjects. Possibly a minor writer in his times, he was considered a well-educated and an amateur artist.

Son of Andrzej Sanguszk and Zofia Sapieha (Sapieżanka). Married Anna Zawiszanka in 1606, they had three sons and five daughters. After her death he married Helena z Gosiewskich. Father of Kazimierz Sanguszko (died in 1655 war with Muscovy), Hieronim Sanguszko (bishop of Smoleńsk) and Jan Władyslaw Sanguszko-Lubartowicz, military officer (rotmistrz and pułkownik of Winged Hussars) who continued the Sanguszko line.

Sources
The Golden Horde: The Encyclopedia. The 3 tons / red. GP Pasha and others. Volume 2: Cadet Corps – Jackiewicz. – Minsk: Belarusian Encyclopedia, 2005. – 788 s.: Il. .

References
 Sanguszko family

16th-century births
1638 deaths
Secular senators of the Polish–Lithuanian Commonwealth
Former Polish Orthodox Christians
Converts to Roman Catholicism from Eastern Orthodoxy
Polish Roman Catholics
Szymon Samuel